Hernesaari Heliport is located at Hernesaari, in Helsinki, Finland. The heliport is run by Helikopterikeskus.
 
The Heliport that used to be in Hernesaari has been closed.

The Hernesaari area is in constant development. The city development board agreed on a draft for the amendment of the town plan in December 2009.

, FastClass  company plans to restart the operations.

See also
 List of the largest airports in the Nordic countries

References

External links

Jetphotos.net – Helsinki Hernesaari Heliport
Airliners.net – Helsinki Hernesaari Heliport

Heliports in Finland
Airports in Finland
Buildings and structures in Helsinki
Länsisatama
Former buildings and structures in Finland